Svrkyně is a municipality and village in Prague-West District in the Central Bohemian Region of the Czech Republic. It has about 300 inhabitants.

Administrative parts
The village of Hole is an administrative part of Svrkyně.

References

Villages in Prague-West District